Liquidation is the conversion of a business's assets to money in order to pay off debt.

Liquidation may also refer to:

 Murder
 Fragmentation (music), a compositional technique
 Liquidation (miniseries), a Russian television series

See also
 Liquidator (disambiguation)
 Liquidationism, in Marxist theory
 Liquefaction, the process of becoming a liquid